San Carlos is a Caltrain commuter rail station in San Carlos, California.

History
The station building was originally built by the Southern Pacific Railroad in 1888. For its early history, the Depot was the only public building in San Carlos and functioned as the town's first community church, library, and post office. The structure was retired from railway use in 1967, but Del Monte and Peninsula Commute trains continued to stop at the station's platforms.

The building was subsequently occupied by the San Carlos Chamber of Commerce and a real estate company. The building was vacant when it was acquired by the California Department of Transportation. In early 1984 a restaurant opened in the depot. It was listed on the National Register of Historic Places on September 20, 1984, as Southern Pacific Depot.

Design
The Richardsonian Romanesque style station building was constructed of Almaden sandstone.

The modern elevated station, opened in 1997, has two side platforms serving the two tracks of the Peninsula Subdivision.

References

External links

Caltrain - San Carlos station

History of San Mateo County, California
Railway stations in the United States opened in 1888
Caltrain stations in San Mateo County, California
National Register of Historic Places in San Mateo County, California
Railway stations on the National Register of Historic Places in California
Romanesque Revival architecture in California
Former Southern Pacific Railroad stations in California